Alfred Wilkes (15 November 1922 – 27 August 1998) was an Australian cricketer. He played eight first-class matches for Tasmania between 1945 and 1949.

See also
 List of Tasmanian representative cricketers

References

External links
 

1922 births
1998 deaths
Australian cricketers
Tasmania cricketers
Cricketers from Launceston, Tasmania